Mama's Boys Music is a management company, record label, and multi-media entertainment conglomerate founded & run by Jerome Hipps and Michael McArthur.

History
Mama's Boys Music specializes in managing the careers of recording artists/performers, producers, and songwriters. Jerome Hipps and Michael McArthur are responsible for discovering and catapulting the career of multi-platinum recording artist Musiq Soulchild. Jerome Hipps and Michael McArthur also served as Executive Producers on Aijuswanaseing, Juslisen, Soulstar, and Luvanmusiq. Included among Mama's Boys clients are multi-Grammy Nominated producer/songwriters Carvin & Ivan (Karma Productions), producer/songwriter Kwame, AAries, Skillz, Courtni Starr, Short Dawg, and Grammy Award winning singer Estelle (musician).

Recently, Mama's Boys Music joined forces with KWL Enterprises, a music company operated by Kevin Liles.

Philanthropy 
Mama's Boys has taken a lead role in uplifting their community by creating the D.A.S.H. (Destined to Achieve Successful Heights) program. D.A.S.H. offers comprehensive crash courses to middle and high school aged children in the business of music, mass media, and sports. The workshops are free, and bring in math, writing, science, leadership, and critical-thinking skills.

Mama's Boys Music Label
In collaboration with Def Jam, Mama's Boys released The Johnson Family Vacation Soundtrack in 2004.

Albums

Artist
AAries
Courtni Starr
Estelle (musician)
Short Dawg
Skillz

Producers
Carvin & Ivan (Karma Productions)
Homecookin Productions
Kwame
Newfaze Entertainment

DJs
DJ Aktive

Engineers
Chris 'TEK' O'Ryan

References

 Vázquez, Luci "Weekly Success Story - Apr 16, 2001", Hit Quarters, April 16, 2001, accessed December 8, 2010.
 Gregory, Kia "Philadelphia's DASH program teaches ins and outs of recording business", Philadelphia Inquirer, August 16, 2010, accessed December 9, 2010.

External links
Mama's Boys Management Myspace page
Black Entertainment and Music Association

Talent and literary agencies
American record labels
Contemporary R&B record labels
Hip hop record labels
Record labels established in 1998
Entertainment companies of the United States